The 2008–09 United States Open Cup for Arena Soccer was the first open knockout style tournament for Arena/Indoor Soccer. In its inaugural season, the St. Louis Illusion were cup winners, due to their victory over the Detroit Waza and the Stockton Cougars inability to field a team for the final due to the late finish of the competition.

US Arena Open Cup bracket

† Due to the withdrawal of the Semifinal Winning Stockton Cougars before April 18, what was originally supposed to be a Semifinal Match between the St. Louis Illusion and Detroit Waza became the Championship Match.

Qualifying

San Diego Fusion qualify for US Arena Open Cup Round of 16

Final: November 22, 2008

OTW Santa Clara 7, Turlock Express 2

OTW Santa Clara qualify for US Arena Open Cup Round of 16

Final November 30, 2008
Fort Collins Fury 4, Dynamite Reserves 0
Fort Collins Fury qualify for US Arena Open Cup Wild Card Round

References

United States Open Cup for Arena Soccer
United States Open Cup for Arena Soccer
Open Cup for Arena Soccer
Open Cup for Arena Soccer
United States